Julian Osgood Field (1852–1925) was an American socialite and writer. Some of his works were published under the pseudonyms X.L. or Sigma.

Biography
Julian Osgood Field was born on April 23, 1852, the son of Maunsell Bradhurst Field (1822–75), who was an official of the US Treasury under Abraham Lincoln, and Julia Field (née Stanton).  Educated in England, he lived largely in London and Paris and became an intimate of the future King Edward VII of Great Britain. Field used the pseudonym "X.L." (or "Sigma") to write decadent horror fiction. His anonymously authored books of recollections have been mined by biographers.

Despite his background, Field was a crook, moneylender's tout, and undischarged bankrupt, pursued by many creditors. 
In 1901 he was sentenced to three months in prison for forging a document under the signature of a representative of Lord Astor's estate office which claimed he was to be paid a large sum of money for authoring society novels. Field used the document in an attempt to raise a loan.

He was responsible for involving Lady Ida Sitwell, mother of Osbert Sitwell, Sacheverell Sitwell and Edith Sitwell in a long-running financial scandal, which began in 1912. In 1914, Lady Ida successfully sued Field for fraud and breach of duty. The following year, she was imprisoned for three months, and Field for 18 months, for conspiring to defraud another wealthy lady, Francis Bennett Dobbs.

Fiction bibliography

1893 "A Kiss of Judas" published in The Pall Mall Magazine, July 1893reprinted in Vampyres: Lord Byron to Count Dracula, ed. Christopher Frayling (London: Faber, 1991)
1893 "The Luck of the Devil" published in The Pall Mall Magazine, October 1893
1894 Aut Diabolus Aut Nihil and Other Tales (London: Methuen & Co.)
1896 The Limb: An Episode of Adventure (A.D. Innes)
1898 With All the Powders of the Merchant published in The Pall Mall Magazine, September to December 1898

Non-fiction bibliography

1893 "A Few Words About Jules Sandeau" published in The Pall Mall Magazine, November 1893
1924 "Things I Shouldn't Tell" (London, Eveleigh Nash & Grayson, 1924).  (This and the next two items were volumes of often scandalous reminiscences about late Victorian and Edwardian high society.  All were published anonymously.)
1924 "Uncensored Recollections" (London, Eveleigh Nash & Grayson, 1924)
1925 "More Uncensored Recollections" (London, Eveleigh Nash & Grayson, 1925)

Plays
 "Society's Verdict", otherwise known as "Found Guilty or the Shadow of Shame". (Shaftesbury Theatre, 1899).

Works regarding

1998 "Alas, Poor Ghost" by David G. Rowlands, published in All Hallows #16

External links
Locus Mag: Stories, Listed by Author: Julian Osgood Field entry
Locus Mag: Stories, Listed by Author: X.L. entry
Tartarus Press/A Guide to Supernatural Fiction Database: X.L. entry

See also
List of horror fiction authors

References

1852 births
1925 deaths
American horror novelists
American male novelists
19th-century American novelists
American non-fiction writers
American expatriates in the United Kingdom
American expatriates in France
American male short story writers
19th-century American short story writers
19th-century American male writers
American male non-fiction writers